Sha Tin Wai Road is a road in Sha Tin District, New Territories, Hong Kong. It runs  from Tai Chung Kiu Road and Sha Tin Rural Committee Road in Sha Tin Wai to Siu Lek Yuen Road and Tate's Cairn Highway in Siu Lek Yuen.

See also

List of streets and roads in Hong Kong

Sha Tin District
Roads in the New Territories